Nikolay Nikolayevich Beketov (Alferovka (now Beketovka), Penza Governorate, Russian Empire – , St. Petersburg, Russian Empire) was a Russian Imperial physical chemist and metallurgist.

He was the father of a well-known Russian architect Alexei Beketov.

Life and work

In 1849, Beketov graduated from Kazan University and worked with Nikolay Zinin. In 1855, he became a junior scientific assistant in the Department of Chemistry at Kharkov University. In 1859–1887, Beketov was a professor at the same university. In 1865, he defended his PhD thesis on "Research into the phenomenon of displacement of one element by another" (""). In 1886, Beketov moved to Saint Petersburg, where he worked at the academic chemical laboratory and taught at the University for Women. In 1890, Beketov delivered lectures on the "Basics of Thermochemistry" at Moscow State University.
 
Beketov discovered displacement of metals from solutions of their salts by hydrogen under pressure. He also established that magnesium and zinc displaced other metals from their salts under high temperatures. In 1859–1865, Beketov proved that aluminum restored metals from their oxides under high temperatures. Later on, Beketov's experiments served as a starting point for aluminothermy.        

Beketov's biggest merit was his contribution into physical chemistry as an independent science. In 1860, he taught a course on "Relations between physical and chemical phenomena" in Kharkov and a course on "Physical Chemistry" in 1865. In 1864, a Physical Chemistry Department in Kharkov University was established with his active participation, where students would conduct research and do practical 
work.

In 1886, Beketov was elected a full member of the Petersburg Academy of Sciences.

Beketov's students were Alexander Eltekov, Flavian Flavitsky and others. The poet Alexander Blok was his brother's grandson.

References

External links

Chemists from the Russian Empire
Russian inventors
1827 births
1911 deaths
Academic staff of Moscow State University
Russian metallurgists
Full members of the Saint Petersburg Academy of Sciences
Russian physical chemists
Privy Councillor (Russian Empire)